Alphonsea hainanensis is a species of plant in the Annonaceae family. It has been recorded from Vietnam and China.

References

Flora of Indo-China
hainanensis
Endangered plants
Taxonomy articles created by Polbot